Art Jam is a Philippine educational art-chored program of ABS-CBN created by the ABS-CBN Foundation (formerly ABS-CBN Lingkod Kapamilya Foundation). It premiered on April 17, 2004 and ended in mid-2005. It teaches the viewers, especially children because they are their target audience how to make simple, unique yet environment-friendly artworks.

The program is hosted by the son of the late King of Comedy, Epy Quizon, the late comedian Tado, Nina Torres and Rosabelle Pangilinan (occasionally). The program gives children some ideas to make artwork.

Art Jam segments

Playtime
In this segment, they make some unique and beautiful artworks using any artwork tools such as cardboard, pencil, pentel pens, colored papers, cartolina, etc.

Food Trip
They use foods to make works of arts which is still edible.

Sketch Pad
In this segment they are sketching some fun, easy but beautiful paintings and drawings.

Junk Art
In this segment they use some recyclable materials and turn them into fabulous artworks like making a plastic bottle into a Piggy Bank and a lot more.

Trivia
 It is currently re-airing in Knowledge Channel starting in 2006. The program starts from 4:30 p.m. to 5:00 p.m. everyday (Mondays to Sundays).
 On the said network, it airs from 9:00 a.m. to 9:30 a.m. Saturdays.
 Later, the timeslot was changed in Thursday to Saturday 12:30 p.m. to 1:00 p.m.
 Their first artwork was the T-shirt with a design related to them which hosts used in the program.
It is currently re-airing on Kapamilya Channel every Sunday mornings at 7:50 am–8:15 am beginning February 14, 2021.

See also
Art Angel
List of programs aired by ABS-CBN

External links
ABS-CBN Website

2004 Philippine television series debuts
2005 Philippine television series endings
ABS-CBN original programming
Children's education television series
Filipino-language television shows
Philippine educational television series
Philippine children's television series
Television series about art